Alopias grandis is a species of giant thresher shark from the Miocene. Estimates calculated from teeth comparisons suggest the living animal was comparable in size to the extant great white shark.  Remains generally consist of teeth, which have been found in the United States in the Calvert Formation of Virginia and Maryland, and in Beaufort County, South Carolina. They have also been found in the Miocene of Malta. It is unlikely it possessed the elongated tail lobe of modern thresher sharks. Some specimens in the Burdigalian show the beginnings of serrations, which are presumably transitional individuals between A. grandis and A. palatasi.

References

Alopiidae
Neogene sharks